Víctor Curto Ortiz (born 17 June 1982) is a Spanish professional footballer who plays as a forward.

He recorded figures of 57 matches and eight goals in the Segunda División for Girona, Jaén and Albacete, but spent most of his career in the Segunda División B, exceeding 280 games and 80 goals in service of ten teams.

Club career
Born in Tortosa, Tarragona, Catalonia, Curto began his career at hometown's CD Tortosa before joining the ranks of FC Barcelona where he played mainly in the C team, scoring on his first of just two appearances with the reserves, a 2–3 Segunda División B home loss to Novelda CF on 6 May 2001. After a similar spell at Valencia CF, he became a journeyman with one-year stints at SD Huesca, UE Sant Andreu, CF Reus Deportiu, CF Gavà, Terrassa FC and CD Alcoyano, never higher than the third division.

On 7 July 2010, Curto signed for Girona FC, his first professional club, making six appearances – one start – over one season in the Segunda División. He subsequently dropped down a level to play and score more regularly at Albacete Balompié. In July 2013, he joined Real Jaén ahead of their first campaign in the second tier for 11 years, contributing six goals from 40 competitive matches as they descended again.

Curto moved abroad for the first time on 30 July 2014, signing along with several compatriots at Belgian Second Division side K.A.S. Eupen. In his two years there he netted 27 goals in 56 games, including a hat-trick on 7 October 2015 in a 6–0 home win over K. Patro Eisden Maasmechelen. While the team won promotion in his second season, he left halfway through to return to Albacete, who ended up relegated back to the third division.

On 31 August 2016, Curto agreed to a one-year deal at Linares Deportivo. After taking leave for depression, he switched to fellow third-tier side Real Murcia the following January for a fee of €35,000.

Aged 35, Curto was crowned top scorer in the 2017–18 edition of the Copa del Rey, scoring six goals to help his team reach the round of 32 where they fell to his previous club Barcelona. He did not take part in that tie, however, having suffered a cruciate ligament injury shortly before.

References

External links

Gavà unofficial profile 

1982 births
Living people
People from Tortosa
Sportspeople from the Province of Tarragona
Footballers from Catalonia
Spanish footballers
Association football forwards
Segunda División players
Segunda División B players
Tercera División players
Tercera Federación players
CD Tortosa players
FC Barcelona C players
FC Barcelona Atlètic players
Valencia CF Mestalla footballers
SD Huesca footballers
UE Sant Andreu footballers
CF Reus Deportiu players
CF Gavà players
Terrassa FC footballers
CD Alcoyano footballers
Girona FC players
Albacete Balompié players
Real Jaén footballers
Linares Deportivo footballers
Real Murcia players
Challenger Pro League players
K.A.S. Eupen players
Spanish expatriate footballers
Expatriate footballers in Belgium
Spanish expatriate sportspeople in Belgium